Hassan Madani (born March 6, 1979 in Cairo) is a male freestyle wrestler from Egypt.

Career
Madani participated in the Men's freestyle 60 kg event at the 2008 Summer Olympics. He was eliminated in the 1/8 final, losing to Morad Mohammadi from Iran.

At the 2012 Summer Olympics he reached the quarter final, where he was beaten by Ri Jong-Myong of North Korea.

References

External links
 Wrestler bio on beijing2008.com

Living people
1979 births
Olympic wrestlers of Egypt
Egyptian male sport wrestlers
Wrestlers at the 2008 Summer Olympics
Sportspeople from Cairo
Wrestlers at the 2012 Summer Olympics